Run of the House is an American sitcom television series created by Betsy Thomas, that aired on The WB between September 11, 2003, and May 7, 2004. Nineteen episodes were produced but only sixteen were aired before the show was cancelled. The show was about a family of four siblings, whose parents moved from Grand Rapids, Michigan, to Arizona, because the weather would be better there for their father's health. But they left the mostly-grown children to stay in their old house and look after themselves, with the 3 eldest siblings also having to deal with raising their 15-year-old sister, Brooke. There was also a nosy neighbor named Mrs. Norris who often popped in unannounced to check up on them.

Cast
Joey Lawrence as Kurt Franklin
Kyle Howard as Chris Franklin 
Sasha Barrese as Sally Franklin 
Margo Harshman as Brooke Franklin 
Mo Gaffney as Marilyn Norris

Episodes

References

External links
 
 

2000s American sitcoms
2003 American television series debuts
2004 American television series endings
Television series by Warner Bros. Television Studios
English-language television shows
Television shows set in Michigan
The WB original programming
Television series created by Betsy Thomas
Television series about siblings